Wes ("Scoop") Nisker (born 1942) is an author, radio commentator, comedian, and Buddhist meditation instructor.
Nisker was a fixture on the San Francisco original free-form radio station KSAN in the late 60's and 70's, and later was heard regularly on KFOG. He has become well known for the catchphrase, "If you don't like the news ... go out and make some of your own," which he used as the title for a 1994 book.

His radio features could be unconventional, like this traffic report: "People are driving to work to earn the money to pay for the cars they're driving to work in. Back to you." He and his books have been covered in various publications of record. He is the founder and co-editor of the international Theravada Buddhist journal Inquiring Mind. He is one of the regular teachers at the Spirit Rock Meditation Center in Marin County, California.

Steve Feinstein of Radio & Records wrote of Nisker's work in 1985: "Nisker is the dean of FM rock radio newspeople. Since 1968 and the days of progressive pioneer KSAN, he's been crafting irreverent, satirical sound collages that present news as an ongoing drama in the theater of life. The timing and rhythm of his work brings to mind music; no wonder that two record,albums have compiled his newscasts."

Nisker is Jewish and his father was a Jewish immigrant from Poland.

Bibliography

References

1942 births
Jewish American writers
American people of Polish-Jewish descent
Living people
People from the San Francisco Bay Area
American spiritual writers
Radio personalities from San Francisco
American non-fiction writers
American magazine editors
Students of S. N. Goenka
21st-century American Jews